On October 6, 1814, prior to the beginning of the Fourteenth Congress, Representative-elect Benjamin Pond (DR), who'd been elected to , died.  A special election to fill this vacancy was held in April, 1815.

Election results

Adgate took his seat at the beginning of the 14th Congress.

See also
List of special elections to the United States House of Representatives

References

Special elections to the 14th United States Congress
1815 12
New York 1812 12
1815 New York (state) elections
New York 12
United States House of Representatives 1815 12